The United Kingdom heatwave of 1911 was a particularly severe heatwave and associated drought. The highest ever accepted temperature is currently  recorded on the 19 July 2022 in Coningsby, Lincolnshire. Weather in Northern Europe was also affected around about this time.

Description 
The heatwave began around early July and ended two and a half months later, in mid September.

The heatwave and drought only ended on 11 September when average temperatures dropped by 20 degrees Fahrenheit (11°C) and the high pressure dominating the country receded, allowing rain over all parts of the country.

Heatwave impacts 
The impacts of the heatwave extended over all parts and sectors of the country. The impacts began to be felt around mid July, around three weeks after the heatwave began. Because of the extreme heat, working patterns changed in Lancashire, with work beginning at dawn, around 4:30 am and finishing around midday, to avoid the hottest part of the day in the quarrying industry there. Fatalities became common and newspapers such as The Times ran Deaths by heat columns as temperatures continued to rise. The heat also caused indirect deaths, by melting the asphalt on roads, causing numerous accidents.

By the beginning of August, even the health of country people was being adversely affected with stifling, humid nights, meaning food spoiled very quickly without refrigeration and sewage spilled out. Also in August, striking became common, most notably in the Victoria and Albert Docks, where the entire workforce of 5,000 people walked out, because of the intolerable heat, meaning the whole area came to a standstill.

Drought impacts 
The extensive drought affected all parts of the country. Again, the effects were felt around mid July, when early harvests were taken in and fires began to break out, along railway tracks in Ascot and gorse around Newbury. By the end of July, the heat and lack of rain had begun to affect agriculture. There was a shortage of grass for cattle as pastures turned brown from drought. This forced farmers to raise the price of milk, to compensate for the lack of production. On 28 July trees and some rare plants had begun to wither and die with the lack of water in the soil, even in shaded areas all around the country. By August, wells, water pumps and water supplies had begun to run completely dry. This led to the stopping of activity in farming and pasture in Essex and the closing of wool mills in Bradford, each an important industry in its area.

An unusual impact of the hot and dry 1911 summer was seen in the County Championship of 1911, where Warwickshire's narrow win was the only time between 1890 and 1935 where the Championship was not won by one of the "Big Six" of Yorkshire, Surrey, Kent, Lancashire, Nottinghamshire and Middlesex. The unusually hot and dry weather created extremely fast pitches that suited Warwickshire's pace bowlers Foster and Field and camouflaged their deficiencies in batting and spin bowling on wet pitches.

Sunshine 

Sunshine in July 1911 broke all time records for the UK and across the south coast of England, with Eastbourne, Sussex topping 383.9 hours, averaging 12.4 hours a day, with many other south coast spots such as Bognor Regis with 372.2 hours not far behind. Much of the south coast outshone many Mediterranean locations, and Eastbourne was very close to the levels of sunshine expected in Las Vegas and in the Nevada desert in the US for July. Since the average July sunshine in Eastbourne is about 255 hours, the town received about 50% more sunshine than usual.

Notes

References 

Heatwave
Heat waves in the United Kingdom
United Kingdom Heat Wave, 1911
United Kingdom Heat Wave, 1911
1911 heat waves